The Mobira Talkman 900 is a brick phone which is discontinued.

References 

Nokia mobile phones